This is a list of placenames in Scotland which have subsequently been applied to parts of New Zealand by Scottish emigrants or explorers.

The South Island also contains the Strath-Taieri and the Ben Ohau Range of mountains, both combining Scots Gaelic and Māori origins, as does Glentaki, in the lower valley of the Waitaki River. Invercargill has the appearance of a Scottish name, since it combines the Scottish prefix "Inver" (Inbhir), meaning a river's mouth, with "Cargill", the name of Scottish early settler William Cargill. (Invercargill's main streets are named after Scottish rivers, e.g.;, Dee, Tay, Spey, Esk, Don, Doon, Clyde). Inchbonnie is a hybrid of Lowland Scots and Scottish Gaelic

North Island

Suburbs of Auckland (incl. North Shore City, Waitakere, Manukau)
Ardmore
Ardmore, New Zealand + Ardmore Airport
Balmoral, New Zealand
Glen Eden, New Zealand
Glen Innes, New Zealand
Glendene, New Zealand
Glendowie, New Zealand
Glenfield, New Zealand
Henderson, New Zealand
Kirkbride, New Zealand (Mangere)
Murrays Bay
Rothesay Bay 
Aberfeldy, Manawatū-Whanganui
Blairlogie, Masterton District
Cape Campbell
Cape Egmont
Dalmeny Corner (Coromandel)
Eskdale, New Zealand (Hawkes Bay)
 Firth of Thames (from the Scottish word "firth")
Frasertown, New Zealand
Gisborne suburbs
 Elgin, New Zealand
Glenbrook, New Zealand (Waikato)
Glenburn, Carterton District
Glendhu, South Wairarapa District
Glendowie, New Zealand
Huntly
Kilbirnie
Kinloch, New Zealand
Laingholm
Langdale, Masterton District
Mackenzie Bay (on Rangitoto Island
Morrisons Bush, South Wairarapa District
Napier, New Zealand
Stronvar, Masterton District
Waverley, New Zealand (Taranaki, after Walter Scott's hero "Waverley")
Suburbs of Wellington
Kelburn, New Zealand, named for David Boyle, 7th Earl of Glasgow
Kilbirnie, New Zealand
Seatoun

South Island

Athol, New Zealand
Aviemore, New Zealand
Avon River / Ōtākaro - named as Avon River by the Deans Brothers.
Balclutha - from the Gaelic for 'Clydetown' (Baile Chluaidh)
Balfour
Bannockburn, New Zealand
Blackmount, New Zealand
Ben McLeod
Benmore Range (mountains)
Ben Nevis, New Zealand
Chatto Creek
Cheviot
Suburbs of Christchurch
Burnside, Canterbury (from burn, the Scots word for a small river
Riccarton, New Zealand
Clutha River (from "Cluaidh", Scots Gaelic for "Clyde")
Clyde
Craigieburn
Craigieburn Range
Denniston (Dennistoun)
Drummond
Dumbarton
Dunback
Duncan Bay
Dunedin, from Dun Eideann, Scottish Gaelic for Edinburgh, and its suburbs listed below. Many of the city's central streets (such as Princes Street and Moray Place) are named after equivalent streets in Edinburgh.
Abbotsford
Balmacewen
Belleknowes
Burnside
Calton Hill
Corstorphine
Dalkeith
Dalmore
The Glen
Glenleith
Glenross
Grants Braes
Helensburgh, New Zealand
Kenmure
Little Paisley
Macandrew Bay
Maryhill
Musselburgh
Port Chalmers
Portobello
Roseneath, Otago
Roslyn
Saint Clair
Saint Kilda
Shiel Hill
Waverley
Dunstan Range (mountains)
Duntroon
Eglinton River
Ettrick
Eyre Mountains
Fairlie, New Zealand
Forsyth Island, New Zealand
Fortrose
Gair Loch on Seaforth River
Galloway, New Zealand
Garvie Mountains
Glenavy
Glenburn, New Zealand
Glencoe, New Zealand
Glendhu Bay
Glenorchy
Glentaki - a hybrid name for the valley of the Waitaki River
Glentanner
Glentunnel
The Grampians (mountains)
Inch Clutha (Meaning Clyde Island)
Kelso
Kinloch
Kirkliston Range
Kyeburn (=River/stream of the cows)
Lake Aviemore
Lake Benmore (Beinn Mor)
Lake Dunstan
Lake Forsyth
Lake Innes
Lake Roxburgh
Lammerlaw Range (mountains)
Lammermoor Range (mountains)
Lauder, New Zealand
Lochmara Bay (Queen Charlotte Sound / Tōtaranui)
Loch Katrine, near Lake Sumner
Loch Maree, on Seaforth River
Lochiel, New Zealand
Luggate
Lumsden
Mackenzie Basin (James Mckenzie)
Maclennan, New Zealand
Maclennan Range (Catlins)
Macraes Flat
Methven, New Zealand 
Mosgiel
Mossburn
Mount Bruce
Nevis Bluff
Nevis River
Ranfurly
Renwick, New Zealand 
Roxburgh
Saint Bathans, New Zealand (Abbey St Bathans)
Seaforth River, named as in Loch Seaforth
Soutra Hill
Sutherland Falls (waterfall)
Water of Leith (river)
Wedderburn, New Zealand

Stewart Island (Rakiura)

Stewart Island
Oban, largest settlement in Stewart Island
Paterson Inlet
Ulva Island
The Snares (not a Scottish name)
Broughton Island

Auckland Islands
 Ewing Island 
 Port Ross
 Campbell Island

See also
 Scottish New Zealander

References

Scottish place names
 
New Zealand
Scottish-New Zealand culture